Salvador Settlement, also called Salvador, Salvador Settlement Corral, is a small harbour and settlement on East Falkland, in the Falkland Islands, It is on the north east coast, on the south shore of Port Salvador. It is one of a handful of Spanish place names on the islands, still in use.

It was founded by Andrés Pitaluga, a Gibraltarian, in the 1830s, who arrived from Gibraltar via continental South America. His descendants still run the farm there and the settlement is therefore sometimes referred to as "Gibraltar Station" or "Gibraltar Settlement".

References

Populated places on East Falkland
1830s establishments in the British Empire